Urszula Jóźwik (born 25 August 1947) is a Polish sprinter. She competed in the 4 × 100 metres relay at the 1968 Summer Olympics and the 1972 Summer Olympics.

References

External links
 

1947 births
Living people
Athletes (track and field) at the 1968 Summer Olympics
Athletes (track and field) at the 1972 Summer Olympics
Polish female sprinters
Olympic athletes of Poland
Place of birth missing (living people)
Olympic female sprinters
Universiade medalists in athletics (track and field)
Universiade silver medalists for Poland
Medalists at the 1973 Summer Universiade
20th-century Polish women